Nasser Zefzafi (Tamazight: ⵏⴰⵚⴻⵕ ⵣⴼⵣⴰⴼⵉ, born on November 4, 1979, in Al Hoceima) is a Moroccan political activist, human rights activist and an advocate of human rights inside Morocco. He is often called the "Moroccan Gandhi" or "Moroccan Pasionaria" for her nonviolent protests. who has been described as the leader of the protest movement in the Rif and the city of Al Hoceima, commonly known as Hirak Rif (Riffian movement). On May 29, 2017, he was arrested by the Moroccan police and charged with a list of crimes such as undermining state security, disrespecting the king and receiving funds from abroad used for plots to destabilize the country. These crimes might amount to life imprisonment. He is currently being defended by a team of lawyers, which include Moroccan politician and former Minister, Mohammed Ziane.

The arrest of Zefzafi sparked a wave of protests across the Rif and other parts of Morocco, and in the Moroccan community abroad. Protests which were often countered with police violence and counter-protest organized by the palace to suppress those sympathizing with Zefzafi.

On June 26, 2018, Zefzafi received a 20-year imprisonment along with the other detainees, including Benjaloun and Ahamjik after numerous cancelled trials since their detention. This verdict created waves of social discontent and sparked outrage among Moroccans.

Biography
Nasser Zefzafi was born in 1979 in the city of Al Hoceima, northern Morocco. Nasser was born in a politically active family, where his great-grandfather Shaikh l-Yazid n-Hajj Hammu was the minister of interior of the Rif Republic under the rule of Abd el-Krim El-Khattabi. Zefzafi's father was an activist in the leftist party of National Union of Popular Forces.
Nasser participated in the 2011–2012 Moroccan protests that took place at his city of Al Hoceima.

Protest
Nasser Zefzafi participated in the protests after the death of Mohcine Fikri, a 31-year-old fish seller, who was crushed to death in a garbage truck on October 28, 2016, after trying to recover his confiscated merchandise. 
In an interview with the news site El Español in January 2017, he declares:
"What has happened to Fikri also affects us: if we keep quiet today, it will continue. That is why we must go out to stop this".
The spontaneous protests evolved to a movement called the "popular movement" or the "Riffian movement", and demanded a list of economical and social reforms, denouncing all kinds of tyranny and corruption.

This contestation took a political and identity turn since April 2017, when the Moroccan government initially accused the Riffian movement of separatism and being secretly steered from abroad, while Zefzafi denied all these accusations.

Arrest

On 29 May 2017 Nasser Zefzafi was arrested in Al Hoceima and then shown transported in a helicopter by Gendarmerie to Casablanca, before being charged with "threatening national security". This was followed with a series of over 100 arrests of other activists related to the movement from Al Hoceima and other cities. Following these arrests, daily protests began in Al Hoceima, Imzouren and other neighboring cities demanding the release of Zefzafi and the other activists.

In an audio of more than an hour that was broadcast on 31 October 2019 on social networks, Nasser Zefzafi announces breaking the link of allegiance to the Moroccan king and abandoning Moroccan nationality. He stated :

He denounced in particular the deportation of Rifans and the siege imposed on the Rif.

Comment from the US embassy in Rabat 

A number of youth from Tangier in US military garb recorded such a video and called for the murder of Zefzafi. The US embassy in Rabat tweeted a few days earlier, on 5 June 2017 that, "The men in msg to Zifzafi video wearing what looks like US military uniforms are NOT US military. We condemn messages supporting violence." and added "We can confirm they are definitely NOT members of the U.S. military and we condemn such messages supporting violence.".

See also 

 Hirak Rif

References

1979 births
Living people
Moroccan activists
Moroccan democracy activists
Moroccan dissidents
Moroccan prisoners and detainees
Moroccan politicians
People from Al Hoceima
People of the Arab Spring
Riffian people